Max Grünwald (born in Austria) was an early twentieth century Austrian football (soccer) inside forward who played professionally in Austria and the United States.

Club career
Grünwald joined Hakoah Vienna in 1920.  In 1926, Hakoah toured the United States.  Grünwald and several of his team mates decided to remain in the country to join local clubs.  Grünwald signed with the New York Giants of the American Soccer League.  He played with the Giants for three seasons, taking second in the league’s scoring table behind Andy Stevens in 1929.  With the onset of the “Soccer Wars” between the ASL and the United States Soccer Federation, Grünwald jumped to the Eastern Professional Soccer League, the ASL having been declared an “outlaw league” by the USFA and FIFA.  When he made the move, he signed with New York Hakoah which won the 1929 National Challenge Cup.  Grünwald scored in the second game as Hakoah easily disposed of St. Louis Madison Kennel.  The end of the “Soccer Wars” brought the merger of the ASL and ESL.  When that occurred, New York Hakoah merged with Brooklyn Hakoah of the ASL to form the Hakoah All-Stars.  Grünwald then played two seasons with the All-Stars.  By 1931, the ASL was collapsing from the twin impacts of the “Soccer Wars” and the onset of the Great Depression.  Consequently, Grünwald returned to Austria where he played at least one more season with Hakoah Vienna.

International career
His only international appearance came on 21 May 1924, when he scored twice against Bulgaria.

International goals

References

External links
 1924/25 Hakoah Vienna team photo

Year of birth missing
Year of death missing
Austrian footballers
Austria international footballers
Jewish footballers
Austrian Jews
SC Hakoah Wien footballers
American Soccer League (1921–1933) players
New York Giants (soccer) players
Hakoah All-Stars players
Eastern Professional Soccer League (1928–29) players
New York Hakoah players
Association football inside forwards
Austrian expatriate footballers
Expatriate soccer players in the United States
Austrian expatriate sportspeople in the United States